The 1926 Green Bay Packers season was their eighth season overall and their sixth season in the National Football League. The team finished with a 7–3–3 record under player/coach Curly Lambeau earning them a fifth-place finish. The season marked the second year the Packers played at City Stadium.

Schedule

Standings

References
Sportsencyclopedia.com

Green Bay Packers seasons
Green Bay Packers
Green Bay Packers